Gargazon is a comune (municipality) in South Tyrol in northern Italy, located about  northwest of Bolzano.

Geography

Gargazon borders the following municipalities: Lana, Mölten, Nals, Burgstall, Terlan and Tisens.

History

Coat-of-arms
The emblem represents an argent tower on a gules hill with three fruit trees. The tower is the Kröllturm built in 1240 by Bartold von Trauston. The emblem was adopted in 1968.

Society

Linguistic distribution
According to the 2011 census, 78.68% of the population speak German, 20.33% Italian and 0.99% Ladin as first language.

Demographic evolution

Panorama

References

External links
 Homepage of the municipality

Municipalities of South Tyrol